USS Detector (AMc-75) was an Accentor-class coastal minesweeper acquired by the U.S. Navy for the dangerous task of removing mines from minefields laid in the water to prevent ships from passing.

Detector was launched 29 May 1941 by the Gibbs Gas Engine Co., Jacksonville, Florida.

World War II service 

Detector was placed in service 18 September 1941; and served in the 1st Naval District and in the 5th Naval District during World War II.  She was sunk in collision with Tanker "Oswego" 300 yards east north east of Finn's Ledge Buoy, Boston Massachusetts 17 February 1942. Later raised, repaired, and returned to service.

Post-war inactivation 

She was placed out of service 13 February 1946 and transferred to the Maritime Commission 8 April 1947 for disposal.

References

External links 
 NavSource Online: Mine Warfare Vessel Photo Archive - Detector (AMc 75)

Accentor-class minesweepers
World War II mine warfare vessels of the United States
Ships built in Jacksonville, Florida
1941 ships
Maritime incidents in February 1942